The 2019 AMA National Speedway Championship Series was staged over three rounds, held at Ventura (June 15), Industry (August 10), and Auburn (September 21). It was won by Billy Janniro, who beat Max Ruml and Gino Manzares. It was the tenth title of Janniro's career, and his seventh in-a-row.

Event format 
Over the course of 20 heats, each rider races against every other rider once. The top eight scorers then reach the semi-finals, with first and second in those semi-finals reaching the final. Points are scored for every ride taken, including the semi-finals and final.

Classification

References 

AMA
AMA National Speedway Championship
AMA
AMA